The number of Shinto shrines in Japan today has been estimated at more than 150,000. Single structure shrines are the most common. Shrine buildings might also include oratories (in front of main sanctuary), purification halls, offering halls called heiden (between honden and haiden), dance halls, stone or metal lanterns, fences or walls, torii and other structures. The term "National Treasure" has been used in Japan to denote cultural properties since 1897.
The definition and the criteria have changed since the inception of the term. The shrine structures in this list were designated national treasures when the Law for the Protection of Cultural Properties was implemented on June 9, 1951. As such they are eligible for government grants for repairs, maintenance and the installation of fire-prevention facilities and other disaster prevention systems. Owners are required to announce any changes to the National Treasures such as damage or loss and need to obtain a permit for transfer of ownership or intended repairs. The items are selected by the Ministry of Education, Culture, Sports, Science and Technology based on their "especially high historical or artistic value". This list presents 42 entries of national treasure shrine structures from 12th-century Classical Heian period to the early modern 19th-century Edo period. The number of structures listed is actually more than 42, because in some cases groups of related structures are combined to form a single entry. The structures include main halls (honden), oratories (haiden), gates, offering halls (heiden), purification halls (haraedono) and other structures associated with shrines.

History
The practice of marking sacred areas began in Japan as early as the Yayoi period (from about 500 BC to 300 AD) originating from primal religious beliefs. Features in the landscape such as rocks, waterfalls, islands, and especially mountains, were places believed to be capable of attracting kami, and subsequently were worshiped as yorishiro. Originally, sacred places may have been simply marked with a surrounding fence and an entrance gate or torii. Later, temporary structures similar to present day portable shrines were constructed to welcome the gods to the sacred place, which eventually evolved into permanent buildings that were dedicated to the gods. Ancient shrines were constructed according to the style of dwellings (Izumo Taisha) or storehouses (Ise Grand Shrine). The buildings had gabled roofs, raised floors, plank walls, and were thatched with reed or covered with hinoki cypress bark. Such early shrines did not include a space for worship. Three important forms of ancient shrine architectural styles exist: taisha-zukuri, shinmei-zukuri and sumiyoshi-zukuri. They are exemplified by Izumo Taisha, Nishina Shinmei Shrine and Sumiyoshi Taisha, respectively, and date from before 552 AD. According to the tradition of {{nihongo|Shikinen sengū-sai|式年遷宮祭}}, the buildings or shrines were faithfully rebuilt at regular intervals adhering to the original design. In this manner, ancient styles have been replicated through the centuries to the present day.

Beginning in the mid-6th century, as Buddhism was brought to Japan from Baekje, new styles of shrine architecture were introduced; today's Shinto shrine blueprint is of Buddhist origin. The concept of temples as a place of assembly was applied to shrines. Spaces for worship were added in the form of extended roofs or worship halls (haiden) in addition to the main hall (honden). The following stylistic elements of Buddhist temple architecture were assimilated and applied to Japanese shrines: column-base stones, brackets, curved roofs, painted surfaces, metal ornaments, corridors and pagodas.
At the end of the 8th century as architectural styles evolved, new elements were added as is evident in kasuga-zukuri (Kasuga Shrine and Hakusandō/Kasugadō at Enjō-ji), the flowing roof or nagare-zukuri (Shimogamo Shrine), hachiman-zukuri (Usa Shrine) and hiyoshi-zukuri (Hiyoshi Taisha). The nagare-zukuri continues to be the more popular style, followed by the kasuga-zukuri. The honden of Ujigami Shrine dates to this period. At the end of the Heian period torii and fences were commonly replaced with two-storied gates and grand colonnades copied from temple architecture. The influence of the residential shinden-zukuri style of palaces and mansions is apparent in shrines such as Itsukushima Shrine.

The auxiliary Marōdo Shrine at Itsukushima Shrine originates from the 13th-century Kamakura period, and the honden and haiden of the Kibitsu Shrine date from the 15th-century Muromachi period. In the late 16th century and early 17th century, during the Momoyama period, gongen-zukuri was introduced as a new plan of building shrines. The main hall was joined to the oratory via a connecting structure called the ai-no-ma, derived from the hachiman-zukuri style. Examples of gongen-zukuri are the honden at Kitano Tenman-gū and Ōsaki Hachiman Shrine. Tōshō-gū dates from the Edo period and was completed in 1636. It is a complex assembly of richly adorned shrines, temples and a mausoleum. Such complexes are a result of the syncretism of Shinto and Buddhism which began to appear during the Heian period; Kitano Tenman-gū, built in 947 for the spirit of Sugawara no Michizane, was the first of these byō or jingū-ji.

Statistics
The 42 entries in the list consist of the following: main halls (honden), combined structures of honden, haiden with or without an ai-no-ma or heiden in between, oratories (haiden), offering halls (heiden), corridors, gates, fences, purification halls and other halls that are related to a shrine.

Usage
The table's columns (except for Remarks and Images) are sortable pressing the arrow symbols. 
Name: name of the structure as registered in the Database of National Cultural Properties
Shrine: name of the shrine in which the structure is located
Remarks: architecture and general remarks including
size measured in ken, or distance between pillars; "m×n" denotes the length (m) and width (n) of the structure, each measured in ken
architectural style (zukuri) and type of roofing
existence of bargeboards, forked roof finials (chigi), step canopies, etc
Date: period and year of the last major reconstruction; The column entries sort by year. If only a period is known, they sort by the start year of that period.
Location: "town-name prefecture-name"; The column entries sort as "prefecture-name town-name".
Images: picture of the structure; If the image shows more than one structure, the respective structure is indicated by a blue rectangle.

Treasures

See also
For an explanation of terms concerning Shinto, shrines and shrine architecture, see the glossary of Shinto.

Notes

Architecture

General

References

Bibliography

Further reading

External links

 
Shrines
Shrines
Japan religion-related lists